Lamprosema cuprealis is a moth in the family Crambidae. It was described by Frederic Moore in 1877. It is found on the Andamans.

References

Moths described in 1877
Lamprosema
Moths of Asia